Ketamine-assisted psychotherapy, sometimes abbreviated as KAP, is the use of prescribed doses of ketamine as an adjunct to psychotherapy sessions. Ketamine-assisted psychotherapy can be used to treat mental health issues, such as treatment resistant depression (TRD), anxiety, and PTSD.  It can also be used for those experiencing substance abuse and physical pain. One of the significant benefits of ketamine-based therapy is that compared to other antidepressants, which have a very slow onset time, ketamine is very rapidly acting analgesic. Ketamine-assisted psychotherapy is a specific therapy that combines ketamine with traditional talk therapy to augment the effects of both.

Background 
Ketamine is a short-acting, noncompetitive N-methyl-D-aspartate (NMDA) receptor antagonist. It was discovered by Parke-Davis Labs and Dr. Calvin Lee Stevens in 1962 during research into derivatives of phencyclidine (PCP). It was first used clinically as an anesthetic. Given its hallucinogenic properties, interest rapidly rose in the possibility of broader avenues of application, including within the field of psychiatry as a treatment for depression, substance use dependence, and more. Because symptom reduction usually only lasts 4 to 7 days, investigation into ketamine as an adjunct to psychotherapy in order for patients to gain long-term benefits has been a topic of interest. The combination of pharmacotherapy and psychotherapy has historically been efficacious in numerous instances, such as the pairing of psychotherapy with conventional antidepressants for mood and anxiety disorders, with naltrexone for alcohol and opioid dependence, and with bupropion for smoking cessation.

Active mechanisms 
There are several hypotheses as to the underlying neural and cognitive mechanisms responsible for the psychiatric effects of ketamine. Its mechanism of action is as an NMDA receptor antagonist. As such, glutamate modulation is a well-known effect, which is specifically believed to confer increased synaptic excitability. Notably, however, the effects of ketamine are now believed to be larger in scope than previously thought, ultimately leading to greater synaptogenesis and neuroplasticity. As demonstrated in animal models, the administration of ketamine propagates signaling pathways surmised to augment neuroplasticity. Key among these are mammalian target of rapamycin (mTOR), glycogen synthase kinase-3 (GSK3), and elongation factor 2 (eEF2) kinase. Ketamine has also demonstrated its ability to increase brain-derived neurotrophic factor (BDNF) levels within the brain in animal studies, which ameliorates the effects of acute and chronic stress. The subsequent increase in both synaptic excitation and neuroplasticity is believed to precipitate the powerful and immediate symptom reduction ketamine elicits for a variety of conditions. It has additionally been theorized that ketamine disrupts the reconsolidation of dysfunctional memories and, through doing so, diminishes the burden of those associated with trauma, anxiety, substance use, and so on.

In combination with psychotherapy 
Given the physiological effects of ketamine, it is hypothesized to be uniquely capable of exceptional efficacy when combined with psychotherapy. The increased neuroplasticity conferred by ketamine is believed to accelerate a patient’s response to psychotherapy and enhance implementation of therapeutic concepts. One example of this may be demonstrated through consideration of cognitive behavioral therapy (CBT), a psychotherapy approach that works by targeting cognitive distortions. By focusing on reversing irrational thought patterns and maladaptive information processing, it ultimately improves emotional regulation. The effects of ketamine are believed to expedite the learning of these frameworks as well as generate greater openness to new ideas. Several other types of psychotherapy have been used in studies with ketamine, including motivational enhancement therapy (MET), functional analytic psychotherapy (FAP), and mindfulness-based relapse prevention (MBRP).

References 

Psychotherapy